The Little River is a  river in southeastern New Hampshire in the United States. It is a tributary of the Lamprey River, part of the Great Bay and Piscataqua River watershed leading to the Atlantic Ocean.

The river rises in Nottingham as the outlet of Mendums Pond. The river flows south, passing through Nottingham Lake, and then east, where it joins the Lamprey River near the town center of Lee.

See also

List of rivers of New Hampshire

References

Rivers of New Hampshire
Rivers of Strafford County, New Hampshire